Richard Old (1856–1932), was an English woodworker and prolific model maker, specialising in fretwork. He was born in Staithes, though for most of his life he lived at 6 Ruby Street in Middlesbrough and it was in that small terraced house that he made all the models - over 750 of them - for which he is celebrated.

A cabinet maker by day, Old would work obsessively through the night on his hobby. Many of the models were scaled down versions of real buildings and other structures famous for their architecture. His miniatures were astonishingly faithful to the originals, right down to the smallest detail.

Old's work has been displayed at various exhibitions since the 1930s. Many of his models formed the 'Richold collection', which of its type was generally regarded as unrivalled. The collection has since been broken up and sold off. Its star piece was a 1:100 scale model of Milan Cathedral, which was painstakingly recreated over a period of 5 years (1/100 the time the real Milan Cathedral took to build).

Until the 1980s Preston Hall in Stockton-on-Tees housed a number of models from the Richold collection.

Late in life, Old made a living from building and restoring church organs. For several years, he was the organist at St John’s Church in Middlesbrough.

References
The Famous Richold Collection of Architectural and Artistic Models by W. H. Todd, 1934

1856 births
1932 deaths